The M. E. Rinker Sr. School of Construction Management at the University of Florida prepares graduates for careers in the construction industry. As part of the university's College of Design, Construction, and Planning, the school's name was officially changed from the M. E. Rinker Sr. School of Building Construction to the M. E. Rinker Sr. School of Construction Management in 2014.

Core curriculum includes a mix of technical, managerial, and business courses. Graduates receive a comprehensive education including theory and practical applications. The Rinker School offers courses leading to the Bachelor of Science in Construction Management, Masters of Science in Construction Management, and the Doctor of Philosophy in Construction Management. Prior to 2014, degrees conferred to graduates were the  Bachelor of Science in Building Construction, Masters of Science in Building Construction, and the Doctor of Philosophy in Building Construction. The Rinker School also offers an electronic distance education based B.S. in Fire and Emergency Services and a master's degree program in International Construction Management for construction professionals via distance learning.

Rinker Hall is known for being the first building in Florida to receive a LEED Gold certification from the United States Green Building Council, the USGBC. The LEED certification is based on the sustainability and green abilities of the buildings certified.

History
Established in 1935, the M. E. Rinker Sr. School of Construction Management is one of the oldest building construction management program in the country.

Undergraduate program

Admissions
The admissions process for Rinker's undergraduate program is competitive.  The School of Construction Management accepts the top 60 students each fall and spring semester for undergraduate studies, based on grade point average.
The Rinker School has over 6500 graduates (5700 BS, 870 MS, and 45 PhD), 250 upper division students, 120 Master's students, 30 PhD students, 21 faculty, and 13 support staff.

Academics
The specialized program at Rinker focuses on a broad range of science, business, and design & construction related subjects, with a strong emphasis on construction management. There are three major segments of the curriculum - science, techniques and management.

Undergraduate students are also given a general business administration education to complement their construction management concentration.  A small group of students choose to minor in Business Administration, as a result of Rinker's prerequisite and upper division coursework, which satisfies a majority of the minor's requirements.

References

External links
 Capital Campaign info about Rinker
 Overview of the School of Building Construction
 webpage for the School

Colleges of the University of Florida
Educational institutions established in 1935
1935 establishments in Florida